There was also a tournament by the same name now called the Principal Charity Classic

The Boca Raton Championship is a golf tournament on the PGA Tour Champions. Since 2007, it has been played at the Old Course at Broken Sound Club in Boca Raton, Florida.

The purse in 2019 was $1.7 million, with a winner's share of $255,000.

Winners

Source:

References

External links

Coverage on the PGA Tour Champions official site
Broken Sound Club – Old Course - official website

PGA Tour Champions events
Golf in Florida
Recurring sporting events established in 2007
2007 establishments in Florida